The 1968 AFC Asian Cup was the 4th edition of the men's AFC Asian Cup, a quadrennial international football tournament organised by the Asian Football Confederation (AFC). The finals were held in Iran between 10 and 19 May 1968. It was organized on a round robin basis, with the home team Iran winning with a perfect record of four wins.

Qualification

Squads

Venues

Results

Goalscorers

With 4 goals, Homayoun Behzadi of Iran, Giora Spiegel and Moshe Romano of Israel are the top scorers of the tournament. In total, 32 goals were scored by 18 players, with none of them credited as own goal.

4 goals
 Homayoun Behzadi
 Giora Spiegel
 Moshe Romano
2 goals

 Akbar Eftekhari
 Hossein Kalani
 Mordechai Spiegler

1 goal

 Aung Khi
 Maung Hla Htay
 Suk Bahadur
 Ali Jabbari
 Gholam Hossein Farzami
 Parviz Ghelichkhani
 Shmuel Rosenthal
 Li Kwok Keung
 Yuan Kuan Yick
 Lim Lu-shoor
 Li Huan-wen
 Lo Kwok Tai

References

External links
 Garin, Erik; Jovanovic, Bojan; Panahi, Majeed; Veroeveren, Pieter. "Asian Nations Cup 1968". RSSSF.
AFC Report for 1968 Asian Cup

 
AFC Asian Cup tournaments
AFC
AFC
AFC Asian Cup
International association football competitions hosted by Iran
May 1968 sports events in Asia